KKMT (92.3 FM, "Star 92") is a radio station licensed to serve Ronan, Montana, serving the Kalispell area.  The station is owned by Anderson Radio Broadcasting, Inc. It airs a Top 40 (CHR) format.

The station was assigned the KKMT call letters by the Federal Communications Commission on July 5, 2006.

On July 3, 2013 KKMT and its CHR format moved from 99.7 FM Pablo, Montana to 92.3 FM Ronan, Montana, swapping frequencies with country-formatted KQRK.

Previous logo

References

External links
KKMT official website

KMT
Lake County, Montana
Contemporary hit radio stations in the United States